Rakovlje is a settlement in the Municipality of Braslovče in Slovenia. The area is part of the traditional region of Styria. The municipality is now included in the Savinja Statistical Region.

A small roadside chapel-shrine in the settlement dates to the early 20th century.

References

External links
Rakovlje on Geopedia

Populated places in the Municipality of Braslovče